Codar is a village in the Ponda taluka (sub-district) of Goa. Codar, also spelt as Kodar, is home to the Goa Government Agricultural Farm.

Area, population
According to the official 2011 Census, Codar in Ponda taluka has an area of 975.28 hectares, a total of 172 households, a population of 733 (comprising 366 males and 367 females) with an under-six years population of 62 (comprising 28 boys and 34 girls).

Location
Codar is located in the eastern part of Ponda taluka.  Codar is to the east of Betora and Ponda town.  In the vicinity of Codar are Tisk, Nirancal, Dabal, Siddhanath Hill and Curti.

It lies approx 10 km from the sub-district (taluka) headquarters of Ponda town, and approx 39 km away from the district North Goa headquarters of Panaji or Panjim.

Local jurisdiction
Codar lies under the Bethora-Nirankal gram panchayat. It covers the areas of Betora, Nirancal, Conxem and Codar. As of 2017, the sarpanch (village council chief) was Sushant Gaonkar and his deputy was Manda Gaude (deputy sarpanch).

References

Villages in North Goa district